The 1933 All-Ireland Senior Football Championship Final was the 46th All-Ireland Final and the deciding match of the 1933 All-Ireland Senior Football Championship, an inter-county Gaelic football tournament for the top teams in Ireland.

Kerry were the reigning champions, having completed the second senior four-in-a-row in 1932, following the Wexford team of 1915–1918. However, Kerry did not qualify for the 1933 final as they were knocked out in the semi-final.

Cavan became the first Ulster county to win an All-Ireland, with first-half goals by Louis Blessing and "Son" Magee. A record crowd attended the game, with about 5,000 more locked out.

Galway may have lost but they were regarded as a force for the future; this proved true as the following year they won their second All-Ireland football title and took the Sam Maguire Cup back to the west for the first time.

References

All-Ireland Senior Football Championship Final
All-Ireland Senior Football Championship Final, 1933
All-Ireland Senior Football Championship Finals
Cavan county football team matches
Galway county football team matches